Annicco is a comune (municipality) in the Province of Cremona in the Italian region Lombardy, located about  southeast of Milan and about  northwest of Cremona.

Annicco borders the following municipalities: Cappella Cantone, Casalmorano, Grumello Cremonese ed Uniti, Paderno Ponchielli, Sesto ed Uniti, Soresina.

References

Cities and towns in Lombardy
Articles which contain graphical timelines